The actuarial present value (APV) is the expected value of the present value of a contingent cash flow stream (i.e. a series of payments which may or may not be made). Actuarial present values are typically calculated for the benefit-payment or series of payments associated with life insurance and life annuities. The probability of a future payment is based on assumptions about the person's future mortality which is typically estimated using a life table.

Life insurance 

Whole life insurance pays a pre-determined benefit either at or soon after the insured's death. The symbol (x) is used to denote "a life aged x" where x is a non-random parameter that is assumed to be greater than zero. Let G>0 (the "age at death") be the random variable that models the age at which an individual, such as (x), will die. And let T (the future lifetime random variable) be the time elapsed between age-x and whatever age (x) is at the time the benefit is paid (even though (x) is most likely dead at that time). Since T is a function of G and x we will write T=T(G,x). Finally, let Z be the present value random variable of a whole life insurance benefit of 1 payable at time T. Then:

where i is the effective annual interest rate and δ is the equivalent force of interest.

To determine the actuarial present value of the benefit we need to calculate the expected value  of this random variable Z. Suppose the death benefit is payable at the end of year of death. Then T(G, x) := ceiling(G - x) is the number of "whole years" (rounded upwards) lived by (x) beyond age x, so that the actuarial present value of one unit of insurance is given by:

If the benefit is payable at the moment of death, then T(G,x): = G - x and the actuarial present value of one unit of whole life insurance is calculated as

where  is the probability density function of T,  is the probability of a life age  surviving to age  and  denotes force of mortality at time  for a life aged .

The actuarial present value of one unit of an n-year term insurance policy payable at the moment of death can be found similarly by integrating from 0 to n.

The actuarial present value of an n year pure endowment insurance benefit of 1 payable after n years if alive, can be found as

In practice the information available about the random variable G (and in turn T) may be drawn from life tables, which give figures by year. For example, a three year term life insurance of $100,000 payable at the end of year of death has actuarial present value

For example, suppose that there is a 90% chance of an individual surviving any given year (i.e. T has a geometric distribution with parameter p = 0.9 and the set {1, 2, 3, ...} for its support). Then

and at interest rate 6% the actuarial present value of one unit of the three year term insurance is

so the actuarial present value of the $100,000 insurance is $24,244.85.

In practice the benefit may be payable at the end of a shorter period than a year, which requires an adjustment of the formula.

Life annuity 

The actuarial present value of a life annuity of 1 per year paid continuously can be found in two ways:

Aggregate payment technique (taking the expected value of the total present value):

This is similar to the method for a life insurance policy. This time the random variable Y is the total present value random variable of an annuity of 1 per year, issued to a life aged x, paid continuously as long as the person is alive, and is given by:

where T=T(x) is the future lifetime random variable for a person age x. The expected value of Y is:

Current payment technique (taking the total present value of the function of time representing the expected values of payments):

where F(t) is the cumulative distribution function of the random variable T.

The equivalence follows also from integration by parts.

In practice life annuities are not paid continuously. If the payments are made at the end of each period the actuarial present value is given by

Keeping the total payment per year equal to 1, the longer the period, the smaller the present value is due to two effects:

The payments are made on average half a period later than in the continuous case.
There is no proportional payment for the time in the period of death, i.e. a "loss" of payment for on average half a period.

Conversely, for contracts costing an equal lumpsum and having the same internal rate of return, the longer the period between payments, the larger the total payment per year.

Life assurance as a function of the life annuity 

The APV of whole-life assurance can be derived from the APV of a whole-life annuity-due this way:

This is also commonly written as:

In the continuous case,

In the case where the annuity and life assurance are not whole life, one should replace the assurance with an n-year endowment assurance (which can be expressed as the sum of an n-year term assurance and an n-year pure endowment), and the annuity with an n-year annuity due.

See also 
 Actuarial science
 Actuarial notation
 Actuarial reserve
 Actuary
 Life table
 Present value

References 

 Actuarial Mathematics (Second Edition), 1997, by Bowers, N.L., Gerber, H.U., Hickman, J.C., Jones, D.A. and Nesbitt, C.J., Chapter 4-5
 Models for Quantifying Risk (Fourth Edition), 2011, By Robin J. Cunningham, Thomas N. Herzog, Richard L. London, Chapter 7-8

Applied mathematics
Actuarial science